Jim Stevenson is a municipal politician who served as Councillor of Ward 3 in Calgary, Alberta. He was first elected in the 2007 municipal election.

Career before politics
Prior to being elected in 2007, Jim served as the president of the N.E. Calgary District for the Conservative Party of Canada from 2000 to 2007. He currently serves as vice-president of the Alberta Urban Municipalities Association.

Electoral record

2007 municipal election
Stevenson was first elected by a very slim margin of 33 votes (5,452 vs 5,419) over George Chahal.

2010 municipal election
Stevenson easily won the 2010 election, taking 62% of the votes (10,913) over runner-up Helene Larocque's 22% (3,905).

2013 municipal election
Stevenson was again elected to represent Ward 3, this time with 81% of the votes.

References

External links 
 City of Calgary Ward 3 homepage

Living people
Calgary city councillors
Politicians from Montreal
Year of birth missing (living people)